James Gibson, MBE is an English former competitive swimmer and breaststroke who represented Great Britain in the Olympics, FINA world championships and European championships, and England in the Commonwealth Games.  He is a former world, European and Commonwealth champion in the men's 50-metre breaststroke event, and now serves as the head swimming coach at the Energy Standard Swim Club.


Born in Chelmsford, Essex, and raised in Witham. He first started swimming at Witham Dolphins swimming club in Essex and is now the clubs lifelong president, Gibson's primary swimming stroke is the breaststroke and he competed in the 50-, 100- and 200-metre events. In 2003 he became world champion at 50 metres (long-course). He was 6th in the 100 metre event at the Athens Olympics in 2004. A year earlier, at the 2003 Summer Universiade, he won titles in both the 50- and 100-metre breaststroke.

In choosing three words to describe himself, Gibson has said, "confidence, positive and pecs", referring to his prodigious pectoral muscles. On a 2003 edition of the sports-comedy quiz show They Think It's All Over he admitted to rippling his chest muscles before races in order to "freak out" the opposition.

He was appointed MBE in the 2004 New Year's Honours. Gibson's club was Loughborough University where he was coached by Ben Titley. He is now a coach himself at the Energy Standard Swim Club primarily training in Turkey.

Personal bests and records held

See also
 List of Commonwealth Games medallists in swimming (men)
 Commonwealth Games records in swimming

References

External links
Personal Website
British Swimming athlete profile
Loughborough University Swimming Club

1980 births
Living people
Alumni of Loughborough University
English male swimmers
Members of the Order of the British Empire
Commonwealth Games gold medallists for England
Commonwealth Games silver medallists for England
Commonwealth Games bronze medallists for England
Swimmers at the 2002 Commonwealth Games
Swimmers at the 2004 Summer Olympics
Swimmers at the 2006 Commonwealth Games
Male breaststroke swimmers
Olympic swimmers of Great Britain
World Aquatics Championships medalists in swimming
European Aquatics Championships medalists in swimming
Commonwealth Games medallists in swimming
Universiade medalists in swimming
Universiade gold medalists for Great Britain
Medalists at the 2003 Summer Universiade
Medallists at the 2002 Commonwealth Games
Medallists at the 2006 Commonwealth Games